The Baldonnel Formation is a stratigraphical unit of Carnian age in the Western Canadian Sedimentary Basin.

It takes the name from the hamlet of Baldonnel, British Columbia, and was first described in the Pacific Fort St. John No. 16 well by L.M. Clark in 1957.

Lithology
The upper unit of the Baldonnel Formation consists of grey massive limestone and dolomite in the Canadian Rockies foothills and in the western range between the Liard River and Peace River. Siltstone and fine grained sandstone occur as interbeds.

In the sub-surface of the Peace River Country, the Baldonnel Formation is represented by porous and permeable dolomite.

Oil and gas production
Gas is produced from the Baldonnel Formation in north-eastern British Columbia.

Distribution
The Baldonnel Formation occurs in outcrops in the Williston Lake area of the Canadian Rockies, and in the sub-surface from the Liard River to the Peace River Country.

Relationship to other units
The Baldonnel Formation is the middle member of the Schooler Creek Group. It is conformably overlain by the Pardonet Formation limestone and siltstone or unconformably overlain by the Fernie Formation shale. North of the Williston Lake it overlies the dolomite beds of the Charlie Lake Formation.

It is equivalent to the upper parts of the McLearn Formation and Ludington Formation. It can also be correlated with the Winnifred Member of the Whitehorse Formation in central Alberta.

Ducette Member
The lower unit is designated as Ducette Member. It occurs only in the south-west of the range, between the Liard River and the Peace River.

It is composed of argillaceous siltstone, very fine grained sandstone and limestone.

References

Stratigraphy of Alberta
Stratigraphy of British Columbia